Epsilon Volantis, Latinized from ε Volantis, is a quadruple star system in the southern constellation Volans. This star is at the center of the constellation of Volans and connects the "wings" of the constellation. Based upon parallax measurements, is roughly 640 light years from Earth.

The primary component, Epsilon Volantis A, is a spectroscopic binary. It is classified a blue-white B-type giant star and has an apparent magnitude of +4.35. (The individual components are classified as B6IV and B8.) The binary system has an orbital period of 14.1683 days. The binary's companion, Epsilon Volantis B, is 6.05 arcseconds away and has an apparent magnitude of +8.1. It too is a spectroscopic binary, consisting of two A-type main sequence stars with stellar classifications of A2 V and an orbital period of "a few days".

References

B-type subgiants
A-type main-sequence stars
Spectroscopic binaries
4

Volans (constellation)
Volantis, Epsilon
Durchmusterung objects
068520
039794
3223